A path is a string of characters used to uniquely identify a location in a directory structure. It is composed by following the directory tree hierarchy in which components, separated by a delimiting character, represent each directory. The delimiting character is most commonly the slash ("/"), the backslash character ("\"), or colon (":"), though some operating systems may use a different delimiter. Paths are used extensively in computer science to represent the directory/file relationships common in modern operating systems and are essential in the construction of Uniform Resource Locators (URLs). Resources can be represented by either absolute or relative paths.

History 
Multics first introduced a hierarchical file system with directories (separated by ">") in the mid-1960s.

Around 1970, Unix introduced the slash character ("/") as its directory separator.

In 1981, the first version of Microsoft DOS was released. MS-DOS 1.0 did not support file directories. Also, a major portion of the utility commands packaged with MS-DOS 1.0 came from IBM and their command line syntax used the slash character as a 'switch' prefix. For example, dir /w runs the dir command with the wide list format option.

This use of slash can still be found in the command interface under Microsoft Windows. By contrast, Unix uses the dash ("-") character as a command line switch prefix.

When directory support was added to MS-DOS in version 2.0, "/" was kept as the switch prefix character for backwards compatibility. Microsoft chose the backslash character ("\") as a directory separator, which looks similar to the slash character, though more modern version of Windows are slash-agnostic, allowing mixage of both types of slashes in a path.<ref>{{Cite web|url=https://docs.microsoft.com/en-us/archive/blogs/larryosterman/why-is-the-dos-path-character|title = Why is the DOS path character ?}}</ref>

 Absolute and relative paths 

An absolute or full path points to the same location in a file system, regardless of the current working directory. To do that, it must include the root directory.

By contrast, a relative path starts from some given working directory, avoiding the need to provide the full absolute path. A filename can be considered as a relative path based at the current working directory. If the working directory is not the file's parent directory, a file not found error will result if the file is addressed by its name.

Representations of paths by operating system and shell

Japanese and Korean versions of Windows may often display the '¥' character or the '₩' character instead of the directory separator. In such cases the code for a backslash is being drawn as these characters. Very early versions of MS-DOS replaced the backslash with these glyphs on the display to make it possible to display them by programs that only understood 7-bit ASCII (other characters such as the square brackets were replaced as well, see ISO 646, Windows Codepage 932 (Japanese Shift JIS), and Codepage 949 (Korean)). Although even the first version of Windows supported the 8-bit ISO-8859-1 character set which has the Yen sign at U+00A5, and modern versions of Windows supports Unicode which has the Won sign at U+20A9, much software will continue to display backslashes found in ASCII files this way to preserve backwards compatibility.

Mac OS X, as a derivative of UNIX, uses UNIX paths internally. However, to preserve compatibility for software and familiarity for users, many portions of the GUI switch "/" typed by the user to ":" internally, and switch them back when displaying filenames (a ":" entered by the user is also changed into "/" but the inverse translation does not happen).

Paths in programming languages
Programming languages also use paths. E.g.: When a file is opened. Most programming languages use the path representation of the underlying operating system:

  uxFile = fopen("project/readme.txt", "r")

  winFile = fopen("C:\\Program Files\\bin\\config.bat", "r")

This direct access to the operating system paths can hinder the portability of programs. To support portable programs Java uses File.separator to distinguish between / and \ separated paths. Seed7 has a different approach for the path representation. In Seed7 all paths use the Unix path convention, independent of the operating system. Under windows a mapping takes place (e.g.: The path /c/users is mapped to c:\users).

Universal Naming Convention

The Microsoft Windows UNC, short for Universal Naming Convention or Uniform Naming Convention, specifies a common syntax to describe the location of a network resource, such as a shared file, directory, or printer. The UNC syntax for Windows systems has the generic form:

 \\ComputerName\SharedFolder\Resource

Microsoft often refers to this as a "network path".

Some Microsoft Windows interfaces also allow or require UNC syntax for WebDAV share access, rather than a URL. The UNC syntax is extended with optional components to denote use of SSL and TCP/IP port number, a WebDAV URL of http[s]://HostName[:Port]/SharedFolder/Resource becomes

 \\HostName[@SSL][@Port]\SharedFolder\Resource

When viewed remotely, the "SharedFolder" may have a name different from what a program on the server sees when opening "\SharedFolder". Instead, the SharedFolder name consists of an arbitrary name assigned to the folder when defining its "sharing".

Some Microsoft Windows interfaces also accept the "Long UNC":

 \\?\UNC\ComputerName\SharedFolder\Resource

Microsoft Windows uses the following types of paths:

 local file system (LFS), such as C:\File
 universal naming convention (UNC), such as \\Server\Volume\File or /<internet resource name>[\Directory name] (at least in Windows 7 and later)
 "long" device path such as \\?\C:\File or \\?\UNC\Server\Volume\File.
 Windows NT object manager \\??\-prefixed paths (global DOS namespace).

In versions of Windows prior to Windows XP, only the APIs that accept "long" device paths could accept more than 260 characters.

The shell in Windows XP and Windows Vista, explorer.exe, allows path names up to 248 characters long.

Since UNCs start with two backslashes, and the backslash is also used for string escaping and in regular expressions, this can result in extreme cases of leaning toothpick syndrome: an escaped string for a regular expression matching a UNC begins with 8 backslashes – \\\\\\\\ – because the string and regular expression both require escaping. This can be simplified by using raw strings, as in C#'s @"\\\\" or Python's r'\\\\', or regular expression literals, as in Perl's qr{\\\\}.

POSIX pathname definition
Most Unix-like systems use a similar syntax.
POSIX allows treating a path beginning with two slashes in an implementation-defined manner,
though in other cases systems must treat multiple slashes as single slashes.
Many applications on Unix-like systems (for example, scp, rcp and rsync) use resource definitions such as:

 hostname:/directorypath/resource

or URI schemes with the service name (here 'smb'):

 smb://hostname/directorypath/resource

Example

Unix style
The following worked example discusses the behavior of a Unix-style file system as it would appear from a terminal or terminal application (command-line window):

Attached to a current working directory (cwd) of:
 /users/mark/

One wants to change the current working directory to:
 /users/mark/bobapples

At that moment, the relative path for the desired directory can be represented as:
 ./bobapples

or for short:
 bobapples

and the absolute path for the directory as:
 /users/mark/bobapples

Given bobapples'' as the relative path for the directory wanted, the following may be typed at the command prompt to change the current working directory to bobapples:
 cd bobapples

Two dots ("") point upwards in the hierarchy, to indicate the parent directory; one dot ("") represents the current directory itself. Both can be components of a complex relative path (e.g., ""), where "" alone or as the first component of such a relative path represents the working directory. (Using "" to refer to a file "" in the current working directory can sometimes usefully distinguish it from a resource "" to be found in a default directory or by other means; for example, to view a specific version of a manual page instead of the one installed in the system.)

MS-DOS/Microsoft Windows style

Contrary to popular belief, the Windows system API accepts slash, and thus all the above Unix examples should work. But many applications on Windows interpret a slash for other purposes or treat it as an invalid character, and thus require you to enter backslash – notably the cmd.exe shell (often called the "terminal" as it typically runs in a terminal window). Note that many other shells available for Windows, such as tcsh and Windows PowerShell, allow the slash.

In addition "\" does not indicate a single root, but instead the root of the "current disk". Indicating a file on a disk other than the current one requires prefixing a drive letter and colon. No ambiguity ensues, because colon is not a valid character in an MS-DOS filename, and thus one cannot have a file called "A:" in the current directory.

UNC names (any path starting with ) do not support slashes.

The following examples show MS-DOS/Windows-style paths, with backslashes used to match the most common syntax:

 A:\Temp\File.txt

This path points to a file with the name , located in the directory , which in turn is located in the root directory of the drive .

 C:..\File.txt

This path refers to a file called  located in the parent directory of the current directory on drive .

 Folder\SubFolder\File.txt

This path denotes a file called  located in  directory which in turn is located in  directory which is located in the current directory of the current drive (since this example gives no drive-specification).

 File.txt

This rather simple path points to a file named File.txt located in the current directory (since the path lacks a directory-specification) on the current drive (since no drive specification is present).

 \\.\COM1

This path refers to the first serial port (COM1).
C:\>more < C:/Windows/system.ini
; for 16-bit app support
[386Enh]
woafont=dosapp.fon
EGA80WOA.FON=EGA80WOA.FON
EGA40WOA.FON=EGA40WOA.FON
CGA80WOA.FON=CGA80WOA.FON
CGA40WOA.FON=CGA40WOA.FON
...
This example uses a path containing slashes as directory separator. The command redirects the content of the file to the more command.
E:\>dir "/Folder/SubFolder/" /Q
 Volume in drive E is Data
 Volume Serial Number is 07BE-0B10

 Directory of E:\Folder\SubFolder

18 October 2008 08:15 AM <DIR> DOMAIN\user .
18 October 2008 08:15 AM <DIR> DOMAIN\user ..
18 October 2008 08:15 AM <DIR> DOMAIN\user File.txt
               1 File(s)          8 bytes
               2 Dir(s)  19,063,000 bytes free
A path containing forward slashes often needs to be surrounded by double quotes to disambiguate it from command line switches.

note: CD does not work this way:

CD "[drive letter]:/Program Files" will only work from the root ([drive letter]:\) directory.

exception: Use the /D switch to change current drive in addition to changing current directory for a drive.

For example:

 CD "C:.\Program Files"
works the same as
 CD "C:/Program Files"

Also, from a root folder:

 CD "C:.\Program Files.\Internet Explorer"
would be treated the same as
 CD "C:/Program Files/Internet Explorer"

If there is no relative path to the directory name specified with forward slashes you will get the following error:

 The system cannot find the path specified.

For setting environment variables, it is sometimes necessary to provide a path that does not contain spaces in it, for instance  defined as "C:\Program Files\Java..." can cause scripts to halt when they encounter the space in the path name. To get the eight-character name Windows assigns to any directory for substitution in environment variables, use the directory listing command with the /x option one level up from the target directory. For instance, the following will get you the eight character name for all directories directly under root:
C:\>dir /x

See also
 Filename
 basename
 Device file
 dirname
 Distributed file system (DFS)
 Filesystem Hierarchy Standard (FHS)
 Fully qualified file name
 PATH (variable)
 URL (Uniform Resource Locator)

References

External links
 Path Definition - The Linux Information Project (LINFO)
 Naming Files, Paths, and Namespaces - Local File Systems : Windows : Microsoft Docs

Computer file systems